South Erradale is a small hamlet, situated on the coastline and to the southwest of Gairloch in Ross and Cromarty, Scottish Highlands and is in the Scottish council area of Highland.

References

Populated places in Ross and Cromarty